Mucuna paniculata is a species of flowering, woody vine in the family Fabaceae, the bean family. It is native to northern Madagascar where it is locally known in Malagasy as vohinkovika. It flowers between June and August.

Distribution and habitat
These vines can be found in both humid and sub-humid forests, usually near rivers and streams.

Toxicity
Species in the genus Mucuna are known to carry irritant hairs. These hairs contain mucunain, an enzyme which causes itching. This enzyme can be destroyed using heat.

Cultivation
This plant usually grows well in well-drained soil under shade. They are propagated with seeds.

Conservation
It is listed as 'least concern' by the IUCN.

Threats
Habitat destruction by slash-and-burn techniques pose a potential threat to the species.

Protected areas
The species is found in the protected areas of the Betampona Integral Natural Reserve, Manongarivo Special Reserve, Marojejy National Park, Masoala National Park and Montagne d'Ambre National Park.

References

paniculata
Endemic flora of Madagascar
Flora of the Madagascar subhumid forests